Clyde Vanel is an intellectual property attorney and entrepreneur serving as the assembly member for the 33rd district of the New York State Assembly. A Democrat, he is the chair of the Committee on Oversight, Analysis & Investigation and Chair of the Subcommittee on Internet & New Technologies. The district includes Cambria Heights, St. Albans, Hollis, Queens Village, Bellerose and parts of Floral Park in Queens.

Life and career
Vanel was born in Queens and raised in the Cambria Heights neighborhood along with nine siblings. He attended Embry-Riddle Aeronautical University where he became a member of Kappa Alpha Psi. He went on to earn an Associates in Aerospace Technology and a bachelor's degree in Aviation Administration from Farmingdale State College. He served as the student government President at Farmingdale State College. He later earned his J.D. from Boston University where he served as the editor-in-chief of the Journal of Science & Technology Law.

Vanel subsequently worked as an intellectual property attorney for the-then largest intellectual property law firm in the country, Fish & Neave, which was acquired by Ropes & Gray, LLP. He currently practices business law, intellectual property and trademark law at the Vanel Law Firm.

Vanel is also an entrepreneur and small business owner.  Vanel was the owner of Vanel's on First, a restaurant and bar in Lower Manhattan, from 2005 to 2011. Vanel is an inventor business owner.  He founded a company that manufactures and sells Clean Bee shirt collar protectors online and on Amazon.  He is also a technology and internet entrepreneur; he owns and operates the trademark service website TrademarkReady.com.

Vanel was featured in Money Magazine, Black Enterprise Magazine and New York Times.

He is an aircraft owner, private pilot and the founder of the New York Metro chapter of the Black Pilots of America.

On March 17, 2023, Vanel's Beechcraft Bonanza lost engine power shortly after departing Brookhaven Airport, and he subsequently made an emergency landing on a mostly empty stretch of beach near the Long Island village of Shoreham. Vanel and his passenger were not seriously injured and proceeded to vacate the aircraft without assistance. A nearby witness recorded the incident on a personal device.

New York State Assembly

Vanel's first run for public office was in 2009, when he ran for the New York City Council against incumbent Councilmember Leroy Comrie in the Democratic primary.  He lost to Comrie, 62% to 38%.

He then ran for New York State Assembly twice. He first ran in 2010 against Barbara M. Clark, again in the Democratic primary. He again lost, 63% to 37%.  He lost to Clark again in 2012, 64% to 36%.  In 2013, he again ran for the City Council, this time in an open seat to succeed Comrie.  He lost the Democratic primary to Daneek Miller, coming in a close second in a six-way race.

In 2016, the incumbent Clark died. Vanel entered the race to succeed her and won a five-way Democratic primary with 32% of the vote, and would easily go on to win the general election.

Vanel is the chair of the Subcommittee on Internet & New Technology. He introduced and sponsored a number of bills and laws relating to blockchain technology, cryptocurrency, Internet sales tax, online data, artificial intelligence, space exploration, sports betting, online poker and aviation.

In December 2021, Vanel entered the race for New York State Attorney General. He withdrew from the race when Attorney General Letitia James withdrew from her run for Governor to run for re-election.

Vanel serves on the following committees: Banking; Children and Families; Economic Development, Job Creation, Commerce and Industry; Corporations and Authorities; Racing and Wagering and Small Business.

References

Emboldened By '08 Race to Roil Waters at Home, by Anne Barnard, New York Times, September 3, 2009.
An Upstart Campaign in Queens Falls Short, Anne Barnard, New York Times, September 16, 2009.
New York commission will study impact of AI, robotics on workforce, Liz Young, Albany Business Review, July 24, 2019.
The State Legislature is waking up to the importance of Tech, Annie McDonough, City and State, January 9, 2019.

External links
New York State Assemblymember Clyde Vanel Page official site
Clean Bee Shirt Collar Protectors
Trademark Ready website

Living people
Politicians from Queens, New York
Democratic Party members of the New York State Assembly
Farmingdale State College alumni
Boston University School of Law alumni
People from Cambria Heights, Queens
21st-century American politicians
1974 births